Marco Terrazzino (born 15 April 1991) is a German professional footballer who plays as a left winger or attacking midfielder for Lechia Gdańsk.

Club career
Terrazzino began his career with TSV Neckarau before moving to VfL Neckarau and subsequently joining TSG 1899 Hoffenheim in July 2007. He made his debut during the 2008–09 Bundesliga season, in January 2009. In January 2011 he transferred to Karlsruher SC along with Hoffenheim teammate Pascal Groß. On 22 May 2012, he joined the SC Freiburg squad.

On 20 June 2014, he joined VfL Bochum. On 18 May 2016, Terrazzino signed for his former club Hoffenheim on a two-year deal.

After making just 9 league appearances during the 2016–17 season for Hoffenheim, he signed for Freiburg for a fee rumoured to be €2.5 million. On 3 January 2020, Terrazzino signed for 2. Bundesliga club Dynamo Dresden on loan.

Terrazzino joined SC Paderborn 07 in October 2020, newly relegated to the 2. Bundesliga, after his contract with SC Freiburg had been terminated. He signed a one-year contract.

In August 2021 he signed for Polish club Lechia Gdańsk.

International career
Terrazzino was born in Germany to Italian parents from Sicily. He was a youth international for Germany.

Career statistics

References

1991 births
Living people
Footballers from Mannheim
German footballers
Germany youth international footballers
German people of Italian descent
German people of Sicilian descent
Association football wingers
Association football midfielders
TSG 1899 Hoffenheim players
TSG 1899 Hoffenheim II players
Karlsruher SC players
SC Freiburg players
VfL Bochum players
Dynamo Dresden players
SC Paderborn 07 players
Lechia Gdańsk players
Bundesliga players
Regionalliga players
2. Bundesliga players
Ekstraklasa players
German expatriate footballers
German expatriates in Poland
Expatriate footballers in Poland